The McAllen Packers were a minor league baseball franchise based in McAllen, Texas. In 1938, the Packers played as members of the Class D level Texas Valley League, hosting home games at Legion Park.

History
The Packers were preceded by the 1931 McAllen Palms, who played one season as members of the Class D level Rio Grande Valley League, winning the league championship in a shortened season, as the league folded following the season.

The McAllen "Packers" began minor league play as members of the 1938 Texas Valley League. After a nine–season hiatus, the Texas Valley League reformed as a six–team Class D level league, with the Brownsville Charros, Corpus Christi Spudders, Harlingen Hubs, Refugio Oilers and Taft Cardinals joining McAllen as league members, beginning play on April 14, 1938.

The "Packers" nickname ties to the local agriculture industry in McAllen and the surrounding region. In the era, numerous packing facilities were in operation to pack produce for distribution to other regions.

The Packers finished the regular season in 5th place in the overall final standings. During the season, the Texas Valley League adopted a split–season schedule. McAllen was in 5th place with a 28–40 record on June 24, 1938, in the final first–half standings, following 1st place Corpus Christi, 2nd place Harlingen, 3rd place Taft and 4th place Refugio.

McAllen placed 5th and ended the 1938 regular season with an overall record of 65–72, playing the season under managers Ray Friday and Wally Kopp. The Packers finished 27.5 games behind the 1st place Corpus Christi Spudders in the final regular season standings. McAllen did not qualify 1938 four–team Texas Valley League playoffs.

The final Texas Valley League regular season standings were led by the Corpus Christi Spudders (92–44), who finished 8.5 games ahead of the 2nd place Harlingen Hubs (84–53), with Taft (68–67) and Refugio (67–67) finishing in 3rd place and 4th place to qualify for the four–team playoffs. Corpus Christi had won the 1st half of the split–season schedule, and tied with Harlingen for the 2nd–half championship. The McAllen Packers (65–72) and Brownsville Charros (30–103) finished in 5th and 6th place, missing the playoffs. In the league finals, Harlingen defeated Corpus Christi to win the title. Both Harlingen (Detroit Tigers) and Corpus Christi (St. Louis Browns) were major league affiliate teams, the only two affiliated teams in the league.

Following the 1938 season, the Texas Valley League permanently folded. McAllen next hosted minor league baseball, with the 1949 McAllen Giants, who resumed play in the Class D level Rio Grande Valley League.

The ballpark
The McAllen Packers hosted minor league home games at Legion Park.

Year–by–year record

Notable alumni
Leonardo Alanís (1938)

References

External links
Baseball Reference

Defunct minor league baseball teams
Professional baseball teams in Texas
Defunct baseball teams in Texas
Baseball teams established in 1938
Baseball teams disestablished in 1938
Texas Valley League teams
McAllen, Texas